Chott Ech Chergui is a large endorheic salt lake in Saïda Province, northwestern Algeria.

Ecology
The Chott Ech Chergui has an area of about 2000 km² where water collects during the wet season, forming a number of large shallow salt lakes which become salt flats as they dry. The lake area has a length of about 160 km from ENE to WSW and lies at an average elevation of 1000 m.

Chott Ech Chergui has been designated a Ramsar wetland of international importance. The Ramsar site has an area of 8555 km² and is the natural environment for a number of threatened and vulnerable animal and plant species.

See also

Geography of Algeria
Hautes Plaines

References

External links 
  Ramsar Convention website
  Direction Générale des Forêts

Lakes of Algeria
Endorheic lakes of Africa
Ramsar sites in Algeria